Wendy Finerman is an American film producer  of nearly a dozen feature films.

Biography
Finerman was born to a Jewish family and raised in Beverly Hills, California. Her sister, Karen Finerman, is a hedgefund owner/trader in New York City and appears on CNBC's Fast Money.

Finerman was one of three producers who won the Academy Award for Best Picture for Forrest Gump in 1994 and a BAFTA Award for Fairy Tale in 1998. She has also produced such popular films as The Fan, Stepmom, Drumline, and The Devil Wears Prada. Finerman was formerly married to producer Mark Canton and now is married to David Peterson. The mother of four children, she is a graduate of the Wharton School at the University of Pennsylvania and runs her own company, Wendy Finerman Productions.

Filmography
In the films listed she was producer unless otherwise noted.

Film

Television

References

External links
 

Living people
American film producers
20th-century American Jews
Wharton School of the University of Pennsylvania alumni
Producers who won the Best Picture Academy Award
Golden Globe Award-winning producers
American women film producers
1960 births
21st-century American Jews
20th-century American women
21st-century American women
Jewish American film producers